Escalante Crater is an impact crater in the Amenthes quadrangle of Mars. It is located at 

Impact craters generally have a rim with ejecta around them, in contrast volcanic craters usually do not have a rim or ejecta deposits.  As craters get larger (greater than 10 km in diameter) they usually have a central peak. The peak is caused by a rebound of the crater floor following the impact.   If one measures the diameter of a crater, the original depth can be estimated with various ratios.  Because of this relationship, researchers have found that many Martian craters contain a great deal of material; much of it is believed to be ice deposited when the climate was different. Sometimes craters expose layers that were buried.   Rocks from deep underground are tossed onto the surface.  Hence, craters can show us what lies deep under the surface.

See also 
 Climate of Mars
 Impact crater
 Impact event
 List of craters on Mars
 Ore resources on Mars
 Planetary nomenclature

References 

Impact craters on Mars
Amenthes quadrangle